Ludovic Robeet (born 22 May 1994) is a Belgian professional road bicycle racer, who currently rides for UCI ProTeam .

Career
Robeet won the combativity award at stage 2 of the 2016 Tour de Wallonie. He competed in the 2017 Liège–Bastogne–Liège, but did not finish.

Major results
2014
 3rd Overall Flèche du Sud
2017
 2nd Circuit de Wallonie
2019
 1st Stage 4 Settimana Internazionale di Coppi e Bartali
2021
 1st Nokere Koerse

References

External links

1994 births
Living people
Belgian male cyclists
People from Nivelles
Cyclists from Walloon Brabant